Maria Huntington (born 13 March 1997) is a Finnish track and field athlete, specialising in heptathlon. She is coached by Matti Liimatainen.

Early life
Huntington was born to a Finnish mother and an English father. She moved to Finland from England with her family when she was five years old. Huntington holds dual citizenship of Finland and the United Kingdom.

Career 
Huntington represented Finland in 2018 European Athletics Championships in heptathlon and finished 19th with a result of 5,731 points. She competed in the 2019 World Championships in Doha, where she withdrew from the heptathlon after the first day. In August 2021, Huntington finished in the 17th place in the hepathlon at the Tokyo Olympics with 6,135 points.

Huntington's heptathlon personal best is 6,339 points, achieved in Lappeenranta in August 2019.

Competition record

References 

Finnish heptathletes
Living people
1997 births
English people of Finnish descent
Finnish people of English descent
Finnish Athletics Championships winners
World Athletics Championships athletes for Finland
Athletes (track and field) at the 2020 Summer Olympics
Olympic athletes of Finland
20th-century Finnish women
21st-century Finnish women